Classically Handsome Brutes was a British experimental rock trio from Leeds, England, formed in 2012 by Harry Reynolds, Will Cook and Jack Scarlott.

Discography

Albums

Singles

Music videos

Members
Harry Reynolds - Guitar, vocals (2012–2020)
Jack Scarlott - Bass, vocals (2012–2020)
Will Cook - Drums, Percussion, vocals (2012–2020)

Musical style
The band's musical style has been described as noise rock, math rock, mathcore, and hardcore punk by critics.

References

2012 establishments in England
British noise rock groups
Musical groups established in 2012
Post-hardcore groups
Hardcore punk groups from Leeds
Mathcore musical groups